Pachydactylus reconditus is a species of lizard in the family Gekkonidae. It is endemic to Namibia.

References

Pachydactylus
Geckos of Africa
Reptiles of Namibia
Endemic fauna of Namibia
Reptiles described in 2006
Taxa named by William Roy Branch